Charles de l'Aubespine, marquis de Châteauneuf (22 February 1580 – 26 September 1653) was a French diplomat and government official.

The marquis de Châteauneuf was the grandson of Claude de l'Aubespine, baron de Châteauneuf. He was made an abbé. He was French ambassador in Holland (1609), in the Habsburg Netherlands (1611–1616), in the Valtellina (1626), and in England (1629–1630).

He then served as the Keeper of the Seals (minister of justice) from 1630, when he replaced Michel de Marillac, until 1633. During that time he was a member of the extraordinary commission that condemned to death the marshal Louis de Marillac and Henri, duc de Montmorency. He conspired with the duchesse de Chevreuse against Richelieu (1633), and was deprived of his office and imprisoned in the castle of Angoulême where he stayed for ten years.

He was appointed again as Keeper of the Seals from 1650 to 1651.

He died at the château de Leuville (Essonne département) in 1653.

1580 births
1653 deaths
17th-century French diplomats
French marquesses
Ambassadors of France to England